Sean Lau Ching-wan (born 16 February 1964) is a Hong Kong actor who has acted in both films and television series. He won Best Actor in the 2007 and 2015 Hong Kong Film Awards and in the 2000 and 2007 Golden Bauhinia Awards.

Career
Lau was born in Hong Kong in 1964. He joined the TVB acting classes in 1983 and made his first appearance on television in the following year in the drama Draw Out the Rainbow. Dark-skinned with no matinee-idol look, he struggled with minor roles until the immensely popular stock market drama The Greed of Man (1992), where he first achieved his leading man status, and acted opposite Adam Cheng. His wife, Amy Kwok, who won the Miss Hong Kong Pageant in 1991, is also a well-known former television actress and co-starred with him on The Greed of Man. Lau starred in two series with ATV in 1991 and again in 2000.
 
Lau made his film debut in 1986 and since then has been cast in numerous roles. His critically acclaimed roles include acting opposite Anita Yuen as a down-and-out musician in C'est la vie, mon chéri (1993) and in a number of cop thrillers, such as Big Bullet (1996), Full Alert (1997), The Longest Nite (1998), Running out of Time (1999), Running Out of Time 2 (2001) and Mad Detective (2007). 

Lau is known for his versatility as an actor, having acted in a variety of genres.

Lau joined Milkyway Image production house in the mid-1990s.

Personal life 
Lau is married to Miss Hong Kong 1991, Amy Kwok Oi Ming.

Filmography

Television series

Film
 
{| class="wikitable sortable"
|-
! Year
! English title
! Original title
! Role
! class="unsortable" | Notes
|-
|1986
| Silent Love
|聽不到的說話
| Kelly Mak
|
|-
| rowspan="2" |1988
| Set Me Free!
|我要逃亡
|
|
|-
| Police Story 2
|警察故事續集
| CID in restaurant
|
|-
| rowspan="2" |1989
| Live Hard
|鐵膽雄風
| Fai / Chief
|
|-
| My Dear Son
|我要富貴
| Maddy
|
|-
|1991
| The Roar of the Vietnamese
|越青
| Fan Wan-tin
|
|-
| rowspan="4" |1992
| Angel Hunter
|女校風雲之邪教入侵
| Jack Chow Man-kit
|
|-
| The Happy Massage Girls
|快樂按摩女郎
|
|
|-
| Tulips in August
|八月鬱金香
|
|
|-
| The Shootout
|危險情人
| Liu
|
|-
| rowspan="6" |1993
| Thou Shalt Not Swear
|七月十四
|Chow's sidekick
|
|-
|C'est la vie, mon chéri
|新不了情
|Kit
|
|-
|Executioners
|現代豪俠傳
|Tak
|
|-
|The Gods Must Be Crazy IV
|香港也瘋狂 / 非洲先生
|John
|alternative title: Crazy Hong Kong
|-
|All Men Are Brothers: Blood of the Leopard
|水滸傳之英雄本色
|Tso Wu
|
|-
|Pink Bomb
|人生得意衰盡歡
|Daniel
|
|-
| rowspan="14" |1994
|Bomb Disposal Officer: Baby Bomb
|拆彈專家寶貝炸彈
|Peter Chan
|
|-
|I Wanna Be Your Man!!!
|神探磨轆 / 聰明笨探
| Liu Che-mo
|
|-
|The Most Wanted
|龍虎新風雲
|Black Cat / Ho Chi-yung
|
|-
|Don't Shoot Me, I'm Just a Violinist!
|山雞變鳳凰
|Mozart
|
|-
|Oh! My Three Guys
|三個相愛的少年
|Ching Yu-hoi
|
|-
|Beginner's Luck
|運財童子 / 狂賭一族出頭天
|Mark
|
|-
|Tears and Triumph
|昨夜長風
|Xie Shi-wen
|
|-
|The Tragic Fantasy - Tiger of Wanchai
|醉生夢死的灣仔之虎
|Dee
|alternative title: The Tragic Fantasy - Tiger of Waichai
|-
|Return to a Better Tomorrow
|新英雄本色
|Lobster Tsui
|
|-
|Shanghai Fever
|股瘋
|Alan Tam
|
|-
|The Third Full Moon
|正月十五之一生一世
|Inspector Lau
|
|-
|Hello! Who Is It?
|喂，搵邊位？
|Officer Ma Fai
|
|-
|I've Got You, Babe!!! 
|播種情人
|Charcoal Lau
|
|-
|It's a Wonderful Life
|大富之家
|Hou Chung
|
|-
| rowspan="12" |1995
|Sea Root
|海根 / 後現代男女
|Sea Root
|
|-
|The Golden Girls
|山水有相逢
|Chun Wai
|
|-
|Romantic Dream
|追女仔95之綺夢
|Hung Chi-lung
|
|-
|Loving You
|無味神探
|Lau Chun-hoi
|
|-
|Once in a Lifetime
|終身大事
|Kei-on
|
|-
|Happy Hour
|歡樂時光
|Chong Tsang
|
|-
|Tricky Business
|整蠱王
|Ko Hing
|
|-
|Mother of a Different Kind
|不一樣的媽媽
|Cheung Hung
|
|-
|Mack the Knife
|流氓醫生
|Chiu
|alternative title: Dr. Mack
|-
|Only Fools Fall in Love
|呆佬拜壽 / 新威龍闖天關—傻瓜與野丫頭
|Chiu Ford
|
|-
|New Tenant
|新房客
| Joe
|Cameo
|-
|The World of Treasure
|富貴人間
|Lion Dancer
|alternative title: Land of TreasureCameo
|-
| rowspan="6" |1996
|Viva Erotica
|色情男女 / 聲色男女
| Yee Tung-sing
|
|-
|Black Mask
|黑俠
| Shek Wai-ho
|
|-
|Muto Bontie
|摩登菩呢提 / 錯體陽謀
|Lam Chak-chi
|
|-
|Big Bullet
|衝鋒隊─怒火街頭 / EU衝鋒隊
|Sergeant Bill Chu
|alternative title: EU Strike Force
|-
|Tristar
|大三元
|Lau Ching-fatt
|
|-
|Beyond Hypothermia
|攝氏32度
|Long
|
|-
| rowspan="5" |1997
|Full Alert
|高度戒備
|Inspector Pao
|
|-
|Too Many Ways to Be No. 1
|一個字頭的誕生
|Kau
|
|-
|Final Justice
|最後判決
|Father Li Chi-ho
|
|-
|Lifeline
|十萬火急 / 烈火雄心119
|Chief Yau Sui
|
|-
|My Dad Is a Jerk!
|對不起，多謝你
|Li Lap-cheong
|
|-
| rowspan="4" |1998
|A Hero Never Dies
|真心英雄
|Martin
|
|-
|Expect the Unexpected
|非常突然
|Sam
|
|-
|Step Into the Dark
|夜半無人屍語時
|Dr. Care Kwan
|
|-
|The Longest Nite
|暗花 / 暗花之殺人條件
|Tony
|alternative title: The Longest Night
|-
| rowspan="4" |1999
|The Victim
|目露凶光
|Manson Ma
|
|-
|The H.K. Triad
|O記三合會檔案
| Ho
|alternative title: The Hong Kong Triad
|-
|Where a Good Man Goes
|再見阿郎
|Michael Cheung
|
|-
|Running Out of Time
|暗戰
|Inspector Ho Sheung-sang
|
|-
| rowspan="3" |2001
|Lunch with Charles
|與查理斯午餐
| Tong
|
|-
|Running Out of Time 2
|暗戰2
|Inspector Ho Sheung-sang
|
|-
|La Brassiere
|絕世好Bra
|Johnny
|
|-
| rowspan="3" |2002
|Fat Choi Spirit
|嚦咕嚦咕新年財
|Ching Wan
|
|-
|Mighty Baby
|絕世好B
|Johnny Hung
|
|-
|My Left Eye Sees Ghosts
|我左眼見到鬼
|Ken Wong / Sam Wong
|
|-
| rowspan="4" |2003
|1:99 Shorts
|1:99 電影行動 / 一比九十九電影行動
|
|alternative title: 1:99 Short Film Series
|-
|Lost in Time
|忘不了
|Hale
|
|-
|Good Times, Bed Times
|戀上你的床
|Magistrate Raymond
|
|-
|Colour of the Truth
|黑白森林
|7 Up
|
|-
| rowspan="5" |2004
|Three of a Kind
|煎釀三寶
|Frankie
|
|-
|The Attractive One
|身驕肉貴
|Hugo
|
|-
|Driving Miss Wealthy
|絕世好賓 / 窈窕淑女
|Mario
|
|-
|Itchy Heart
|七年很癢 / 7年很癢
|Poon Chi-man
|
|-
|Fantasia
|鬼馬狂想曲
|Director Man
|
|-
|2005
|Himalaya Singh
|喜馬拉亞星
|Panic
|
|-
| rowspan="2" |2006
|The Shopaholics
|最愛女人購物狂 / 購物狂
|Choosey Lee Kan-yan
|
|-
|My Name is Fame
|我要成名
|Poon Kar-fai
|
|-
|2007
|Mad Detective
|神探
|Chan Kwai-bun
|
|-
| rowspan="3" |2009
|Overheard
|竊聽風雲
|Johnny Leung
|alternative title: Wiretap
|-
|Written By
|再生號
|Tony Tong
|
|-
|Poker King
|撲克王
|Uno
|
|-
| rowspan="2" |2011
|Life Without Principle
|奪命金
|Panther
|alternative title: Death of a Hostage
|-
|Overheard 2
|竊聽風雲2
|Manson Lo Man-sang
|
|-
| rowspan="3" |2012
|The Fairy Tale Killer
|追凶 / 完美童話 / 索命童話
|Inspector Wong Wai-han
|alternative title: Perfect Fairy Tale
|-
|The Great Magician
|大魔術師
|General Lei
|
|-
|The Bullet Vanishes
|消失的子彈
|Inspector Song Donglu
|alternative title: Ghost Bullets / Disappeared Bullets / Lost Bullets
|-
| rowspan="2" |2013
|Out of Inferno
|逃出生天 / 逃出生天3D
|Mak Tai-kwan
|alternative title: Inferno 3D
|-
|The White Storm
|掃毒 / 變役
|Ma Ho-tin
|alternative title: Metamorphosis / The Cartel War
|-
|2014
|Overheard 3
|竊聽風雲3
|Luk Kam-keung
|
|-
| rowspan="3" |2015
|Insanity
|暴瘋語
|Fan Kwok-sang
|
|-
|Tale of Three Cities
|三城記
|Fang Daolong
|
|-
|The Vanished Murderer
|消失的兇手
|Song Donglu
|alternative title: The Bullet Vanishes 2 / The Murderer Vanishes
|-
| rowspan="2" |2016
|Call of Heroes
|危城 / 危城殲霸
|Yang Kenan
|alternative title: The Deadly Reclaim
|-
|Heartfall Arises
|驚心破 / 驚天破
|Calvin Che
|
|-
|2017
|Dealer/Healer
|毒。誡
|Chan Wah
|
|-
| rowspan="2" |2019
|'My Pet is an Elephant|我的寵物是大象
|Qi Wei
|Post-production
|-
|Integrity|廉政風雲 煙幕
|Chan King-Chi
|
|-
|2020
|Shock Wave 2|拆彈專家2
|Tung Cheuk-man
|
|-
| rowspan="2" |2022
|Detective vs Sleuths|神探大戰
|
|
|-
|Warriors of Future|明日戰記
|Johnson Cheng 
|
|-
|2023
|The White Storm 3: Heaven or Hell|掃毒3
|Hong So-chai
|
|-
|TBD
|Sons of the Neon Night|風林火山
|
|Post-production
|}

Dubbing
Lau has also done voiceover work for films:
 

Host

Awards and nominations
Lau has won Best Actor Awards at the Hong Kong Film Critics Society Awards in 1997, 2001, 2011, 2014 and the Golden Bauhinia Awards in 1999 and 2007. He also won his first Best Actor award at the Hong Kong Film Awards in 2007 for his performance in the film, My Name is Fame. He won his first Golden Horse Award in 2012 for his performance in Life Without Principle''.

References

External links

HK cinemagic entry

 

1964 births
Living people
Hong Kong male film actors
Hong Kong male television actors
People from Sanshui District
TVB actors
20th-century Hong Kong male actors
21st-century Hong Kong male actors